Hell No may refer to:

Music
 "Hell No!", a 2005 single by Australian pop singer Ricki Lee Coulter
 "Hell No (Leave Home)", a 2007 single by American R&B singer Monica
 "Hell No", a bonus track by The Hives on The Black and White Album, 2007
 "Hell No" (Ingrid Michaelson song), a 2016 song by Ingrid Michaelson
 "Hell No" (Toby Keith song), a 2006 song by Toby Keith
 "Hell No", a song by Bruce Dickinson from Balls to Picasso, 1994

Sports
 Team Hell No, a WWE Tag Team formed by Kane and Daniel Bryan

Places
 Hell, Norway